Silvio is a masculine given name. 

Silvio may also refer to:

"Silvio" (song), a 1988 song by Bob Dylan from his album Down in the Groove
Silvio (horse), winner of the 1877 Epsom Derby
HMS Silvio, two Royal Navy ships
Silvio's Pizza, a franchise in Australia, later rebranded Domino's Pizza Enterprises or Domino's